KAFOS (Karadeniz Fiber Optik Sistemi - Black Sea Fibre Optic System) is a submarine telecommunications cable system in the Black Sea linking Romania, Bulgaria, and Turkey.

It has landing points in:
Mangalia, Romania
Varna, Bulgaria
Istanbul, Turkey

it has a transmission capacity of 8 Tbit/s, and a total cable length of 504 km. It started operation on 13 June 1997.

References
https://web.archive.org/web/20070930122255/http://foptnet.ge/map2eng.htm Map of the cable system (3 Systems BSFOCS, KAFOS, & ITUR)

Submarine communications cables in the Black Sea
Bulgaria–Turkey relations
Bulgaria–Romania relations
Romania–Turkey relations
Optical telecommunications cables
Internet in Bulgaria
1997 establishments in Bulgaria
1997 establishments in Romania
1997 establishments in Turkey